Orbiting Vehicle or OV, originally designated SATAR (SATellite - Atmospheric Research), comprised five disparate series of standardized American satellites operated by the US Air Force, launched between 1965 and 1971. Forty seven satellites were built, of which forty three were launched and thirty seven reached orbit. With the exception of the OV3 series and OV4-3, they were launched as secondary payloads, using excess space on other missions. This resulted in extremely low launch costs and short proposal-to-orbit times. Typically, OV satellites carried scientific and/or technological experiments, 184 being successfully orbited through the lifespan of the program.

The first OV series, designated OV1, was built by General Dynamics and carried on suborbital Atlas missile tests; the satellites subsequently placed themselves into orbit by means of an Altair-2 kick motor. The Northrop-built OV2 satellites were built using parts left over following the cancellation of the Advanced Research Environmental Test Satellite; three OV2 spacecraft flew on Titan IIIC test flights. Space General built the OV3 satellites, the only series to be launched on dedicated rockets; six were launched on Scout-B rockets between 1966 and 1967. OV4 satellites were launched as part of a test flight for the Manned Orbiting Laboratory (MOL), with two satellites conducting a communications experiment whilst a third, OV4-3, was the primary payload, a boilerplate mockup of the MOL space station. Two further OV4 satellites, duplicates of the first two, were built but not launched. OV5 satellites were launched as secondary payloads on Titan IIIC rockets as part of the Environmental Research Satellite program. 

The OV program was phased out in the late 1960s, the last of the series (an OV1) flying in 1971. It was succeeded by the Space Test Program, which focused on tailored satellites with specific payloads rather than standardized ones.

Program origin

The Orbiting Vehicle satellite program arose from a US Air Force initiative, begun in the early 1960s, to reduce the expense of space research. Through this initiative, satellites would be standardized to improve reliability and cost-efficiency, and where possible, they would fly on test vehicles or be piggybacked with other satellites. In 1961, the Air Force Office of Aerospace Research (OAR) created the Aerospace Research Support Program (ARSP) to request satellite research proposals and choose mission experiments. The USAF Space and Missiles Organization created their own analog of the ARSP called the Space Experiments Support Program (SESP), which sponsored a greater proportion of technological experiments than the ARSP. Five distinct OV series of standardized satellites were developed under the auspices of these agencies.

Summary of launches

OV1

Background

The OV1 series was an evolution of the 2.7 m "Scientific Passenger Pods" (SPP), which, starting on 2 October 1961, rode piggyback on suborbital Atlas missile tests and conducted scientific experiments during their short time in space. General Dynamics received a $2 million contract on 13 September 1963 to build a new version of the SPP (called the Atlas Retained Structure (ARS)) that would carry a self-orbiting satellite. Once the Atlas missile and ARS reached apogee, the satellite inside would be deployed and thrust itself into orbit.

Dubbed "Satellite for Aerospace Research" (SATAR), the series of satellites was originally to be launched from the Eastern Test Range on Atlas missions testing experimental Advanced Ballistic Re-Entry System (ABRES) nosecones. However, in 1964, the Air Force transferred ABRES launches to the Western Test Range causing a year's delay for the program. Moreover, because WTR launches would be into polar orbit as opposed to the low-inclination orbits typical of ETR launches, less mass could be lofted into orbit using the same thrust, and the mass of the SATAR satellites had to be reduced.

Spacecraft

Two  antennae for transmitting telemetry and receiving commands extended from the sides of the spacecraft. 12 helium-pressurized hydrogen peroxide thrusters provided attitude control. Starting with OV1-7, the solar cells were flat rather than rounded, and the satellites carried the Vertistat attitude system that used a Sun sensor to determine the spacecraft's orientation to the Sun.

Operations

Ultimately, only the first of the SATARs, (OV1-1, called Atmospheric Research Vehicle (ARV) at the time) ever flew piggyback on an ABRES mission. The rest were flown on ex-ICBM Atlas D and F boosters specifically purchased by the OAR for the OV1 series (except OV1-6, which flew on the Manned Orbiting Laboratory test flight on 2 November 1966). Typically, the satellites were mounted in the nose cone of the launching rocket; OV1-1, OV1-3 and OV1-86 were side mounted. A jettisonable propulsion module with an Altair 2 solid-propellant motor provided the thrust for final orbital insertion.

The OV1/Atlas combination was economical for the time, costing just $1.25 million per launch ($4545 per  of payload). The standardized format also afforded a quick experiment proposal-to-launch period of just fifteen months. The program was managed by Lt. Col. Clyde Northcott, Jr.

Significant results

Data from OV1-4's Tissue Equivalent Ionization Chamber, compared to a similar instrument orbited on Gemini 4, determined the radiation dose Gemini astronauts traveling at OV1-4's altitude (~) would receive: 4 rads per day at a 30° inclination orbit or 1.5 rads per day at a 90° (polar) inclination orbit.

In late May 1967, during a period of high solar and magnetic activity, OV1-9 returned the first evidence of Earth's long theorized but never measured electric field. OV1-9 also studied the variation of proton fluxes in the outer Van Allen Belt during that same period, determining that fluxes were ten times greater four days after May's maximum solar activity than they had been before the flare; it took ten days for the fluxes to return to normal levels. The X-ray spectrometer on the co-launched OV1-10 returned the most comprehensive set of solar X-ray observations to date. These data enabled scientists to determine the relative density of neon to magnesium in the solar corona through direct observation rather than using complicated mathematical models. The ratio of neon to magnesium was found to be 1.47 to 1 (+/- .38).

OV1 Missions

OV2

Background

The OV2 series of satellites was originally designed as part of the ARENTS (Advanced Research Environmental Test Satellite) program, intended to obtain supporting data for the Vela satellites, which monitored the Earth for violations of the 1963 Partial Test Ban Treaty. Upon the cancellation of ARENTS due to delays in the Centaur rocket stage, the program's hardware (developed by General Dynamics) was repurposed to fly on the Titan III (initially the A, ultimately the C) booster test launches. The USAF contracted Northrop to produce these satellites, with William C. Armstrong of Northrop Space Laboratories serving as the program manager.

Spacecraft

The power system, which included NiCd batteries for night-time operations, provided 63 W of power. Experiments were generally mounted outside the cube while satellite systems, including tape recorder, command receiver, and PAM/FM/FM telemetry system, were installed inside. Four small solid rocket motors spun, one on each paddle, were designed to spin the OV2 satellites upon reaching orbit, providing gyroscopic stability. Cold-gas jets maintained this stability, receiving information on the satellite's alignment with respect to the Sun via an onboard solar aspect sensor, and with respect to the local magnetic field via two onboard fluxgate magnetometers. A damper kept the satellites from precessing (wobbling around its spin axis). Passive thermal control kept the satellites from overheating.

Operations

Three OV2 satellites with different mission objectives were originally planned when the OV2 program began. The OV2 series was ultimately expanded to five satellites, all with different goals. Only OV2-5, a radiation and astronomical satellite, achieved a degree of success.

Significant results

OV2-5 proton energy data collected 2–13 October 1968 in the energy range of 0.060 to 3.3 Mev, showed an eight-fold reduction in particle flux between solar storms and quiet periods. Measuring the angle at which protons encountered the satellite also helped refine theoretical models of how the magnetosphere interacts with the flux of charged particles.

OV2 Missions

OV3

Background

Unlike the OV1 and OV2 series satellites, which were designed to use empty payload space on rocket test launches, the six OV3 satellites all had dedicated Scout boosters. In this regard, the OV3 series was more akin to its civilian science program counterparts (e.g. Explorer). OV3 differed from NASA programs in its heavy use of off-the-shelf equipment, which resulted in lower unit cost.

The first four satellites in the series were made the Aerojet subsidiary Space General Corporation under a $1.35m contract awarded 2 December 1964, the first satellite due October 1965. The last two satellites were built by Air Force Cambridge Research Laboratory (AFCRL), which also managed the entire series and provided four of the OV3 payloads.

Charles H. Reynolds, who worked at AFCRL from 1955, was the technical manager for the OV3 program.

Spacecraft

The OV3 satellites were octagonal prisms,  in length and width (for OV3-5 and OV3-6, length was reduced to ), with experiments mounted on booms. 2560 solar cells provided 30 Watts of power. The satellite was spin-stabilized, but because it was asymmetrical once its booms were extended, OV3-2 maintained its attitude in orbit with a precession damper. The spacecraft was spin stabilized at 8 revolutions per minute (rpm) A sun sensor, as well as an onboard tri-axial magnetnometer, gave information on the satellite's aspect (facing), its spin rate, and rate of precession. Design life-span was one year.

Operations

The OV3 program ultimately comprised 6 missions, five of them successful. The last (OV3-6) flew on 4 December 1967. The OV3 program was terminated following OV3-6 in favor of the cheaper OV1 program.

Significant Results

OV3-1 had a near polar orbit and returned useful data on the energy and distribution of electrons in the auroral regions. 
Data returned by OV3-4 helped prove and refine theoretical models of radiation dosage an astronaut would receive at orbital altitudes. 
OV3-3 VLF receiver data determined the location of the plasmapause (the outer boundary of the Earth's inner magnetosphere).
OV3-2 observed ambient charged particle variations before, during, and after the 12 November 1966 South American solar eclipse. OV3-2 also conducted ionospheric and aurora research in orbit in conjunction with AFCRL KC-135 aircraft flying underneath, conducting simultaneous measurements. The National Research Council of Canada also conducted coordinated, simultaneous ionospheric observations.
OV3-6 measured much larger latitude variations than current atmospheric models had expected. A bulge in the neutral density in the summer hemisphere was also discovered. The data obtained was used to construct more accurate atmospheric models, and to correlate physical chemistry reactions to disturbances originating from the sun.

OV3 Missions

OV4

Background

The OV4 series was designed to utilize space aboard the Manned Orbiting Laboratory (MOL) test flights. In September 1964, Raytheon was awarded a $220,000 contract to build a one-off pair of satellites, designed by the U.S.A.F. Avionics Laboratory. These two satellites would investigate long range radio propagation in the charged atmosphere of the ionosphere analogous to the whispering gallery transmission of sounds under a physical dome. In this way, the OV4-1 pair would evaluate the ionosphere's F layer as method of facilitating HF and VHF transmissions between satellites not in line of sight of each other.

Spacecraft

The OV4-1 satellite pair consisted of a transmitting spacecraft and a receiving spacecraft. OV4-1T's transmitter broadcast on three frequencies in the 20-50 MHz range. OV4-1R included receiving equipment and telemetry broadcast equipment. Launched into slightly different  orbits, the satellites would test whispering gallery communications over a range of distances; OV4-1T included a small rocket motor to maximize orbital separation (180°) from OV4-1R.

Both satellites were cylindrical,  in diameter, with domed upper ends. Silver oxide/zinc batteries provided for a 50-day lifespan.

Two sets of OV4 "whispering gallery" satellites were built. OV4-2T and OV4-2R were never flown.

Operations

OV4-1T and OV4-1R were scheduled for launch on the MOL Heat Shield Qualification flight, with a Titan IIIC rocket. The dummy MOL (a Titan first-stage oxidizer tank) was equipped with a variety of experiments and dubbed OV4-3. OV1-6 was also mounted on the Titan III. The rocket took off from Cape Canaveral Launch Complex 40 on 3 November 1966 at 13:50:42 UTC.

OV4 Missions

OV5

Background

The OV5 program was a continuation of the Environmental Research Satellite (ERS) series developed by Space Technology Laboratories, a subdivision of TRW Inc. These were very small satellites launched pick-a-back with primary payloads since 1962—a natural fit under the Orbiting Vehicle umbrella. The primary innovation over the earlier ERS series was a command receiver, allowing instructions to be sent from the ground, and a Pulse-code modulation  digital telemetry system, versus the analog transmitters used on prior ERS missions. Like prior ERS, the OV5s were spin-stabilized and heat was passively controlled. All of the OV5 series were built by TRW with the exception of OV5-6, built by AFCRL, and OV5-9, built by Northrop Corporation.

OV5 Missions

Program conclusion

The OV program was phased out in the late 1960s, the last of the series (an OV1) flying in 1971. The program orbited 184 experiments at extremely low launch costs and with very short proposal-to-orbit times.

OV was succeeded by the Space Test Program, managed by the Space Missile Organization's Space Experiments Support Program, which had absorbed the ARSP in 1968. The Space Test Program followed the new trend in satellites, which preferred custom-built one-offs with specific payloads to vehicles built on standardized plans.

References

Satellites orbiting Earth
Military space program of the United States
Satellite series